Churakayevo (Suraqay) is a rural locality (a selo) in Shafranovsky Selsoviet, Alsheyevsky District, Bashkortostan, Russia. The population was 477 as of 2010. There are 4 streets.

Geography 
Churakayevo is located 17 km southwest of Rayevsky (the district's administrative centre) by road. Shafranovo is the nearest rural locality.

References 

Rural localities in Alsheyevsky District